Richard Martin West (born 1941) is a Danish astronomer and discoverer of astronomical objects with a long career at the European Southern Observatory (ESO) and at the International Astronomical Union (IAU).

He discovered numerous comets, including Comet West (C/1975 V1), which was one of the brightest comets of the 1970s, and the periodic comets 76P/West–Kohoutek–Ikemura and 123P/West–Hartley.

He is also credited by the Minor Planet Center with the discovery of 40 minor planets between 1976 and 1986, including 2146 Stentor and 2148 Epeios, two Trojan asteroids. Together with Hans-Emil Schuster, he co-discovered the Phoenix Dwarf galaxy.

Early life and education 

West was born in Copenhagen in 1941. He completed high school in 1959 and then achieved a degree in astronomy and astrophysics from University of Copenhagen in 1964.

Career at ESO 
Richard West began working at ESO in 1970, when he joined as Assistant Astronomer to the ESO Director General, Adriaan Blaauw. His career took a leap in 1972, when he charged one of the first and largest scientific programmes of ESO: the Sky Atlas Laboratory project to systematically map the southern hemisphere.

West was a leading figure in helping out and establishing serious collaborations with the scientific communities of the Central and Eastern European countries in the wake of the political, social and economical turmoil following the collapse and dismantling of the Soviet block in the early 1990s. 

West retired in 2005, after a continuous employment at ESO.

Positions 

Richard West focussed a lot of his worklife on the organizational matters of the international scientific community in addition to science communications in general. He held a number of influential positions:
 Assistant General Secretary of the IAU in 1979–1982.
 General Secretary of the IAU (1982–1985). 
 Presided over a number of IAU Commissions, including Commission 20 from 1988 to 1991.
 Member of the Executive Committee of ICSU.

Awards and honors 
 Rosenkjaer Prize. A prestigious award in Denmark, given for outstanding science or culture communication.
 The main-belt asteroid 2022 West was named in his honor.

List of discovered minor planets

References

External links 
 Richard West's homepage

1941 births
21st-century Danish astronomers
20th-century Danish astronomers
Discoverers of asteroids
Discoverers of comets

Living people
University of Copenhagen alumni
Scientists from Copenhagen